Chittajallu Rajeevalochana (15 August 1935 – 5 March 2013), better known as Rajasulochana,  was an Indian classical dancer and actress. She has acted in more than 300 Telugu, Tamil, Kannada, Malayalam and Hindi language films.

Early life
She was born on 15 August 1935 in Bezawada (now Vijayawada), in Andhra Pradesh. Her father, Pilliarchetty Bhakthavatsalam Naidu worked in Indian Railways and was transferred to Madras as PA to the General Manager of M&SM Railway. At school, her name was recorded in error as Rajasulochana.

Career
She learned Indian classical dance from Lalithamma, K. N. Dhandayuthapani Pillai, Acharyulu and Vempati Chinna Satyam, Krishnakumar, Vishnu Vysarkar, and Kalamandalam Madhavan.

The Kannada stage and screen maestro H. L. N. Simha gave her an acting opportunity in Gunasagari (Kannada, 1953), produced by Gubbi Veeranna. Subsequently, she acted in about 274 films in all South Indian languages. She acted with all the leading stars of South Indian cinema such as M. G. Ramachandran, Sivaji Ganesan, N. T. Rama Rao, Akkineni Nageswara Rao, Rajkumar, S. S. Rajendran, Prem Nazir, A. P. Nagarajan and M. N. Nambiar.

Pushpanjali Nritya Kala Kendram
She founded the dance school "Pushpanjali Nritya Kala Kendram" in 1961 in Chennai. It has trained many students in Indian classical dance forms and celebrated its Silver Jubilee in 1986. She gave many dance performances in India and abroad and got critical acclaim for the dance dramas.

Personal life
She had a son out of her first marriage and after it ended in a divorce, she married actor-director C. S. Rao and had twin daughters. One daughter lives in Chennai. The other twin daughter and son live in Chicago, Illinois.

Death
Rajasulochana died in Chennai on 5 March 2013 at the age of 77. Condoling her death, Tamil Nadu Chief Minister Jayalalithaa said the actress had left an imprint for herself in the film industry. She was engaged in creating artistes in her dance school "Pushpanjali Nrithya Kala Kendram" here, Jayalalithaa said.

Partial filmography

1950s
1953 Gunasagari - Debut film

1953 Kanna Talli - Guest role

1954 Anta Manavalle

1954 Mangalyam

1954 Bedara Kannappa

1954 Sri Kalahastiswara Mahatyam - Chintamani

1955 Gulebakavali

1955 Pennarasi

1956 Chori Chori - Bhagwan's wife

1956 Marma Veeran

1956 Penki Pellam

1956 Rangoon Radha - Radha

1956 Gulebhagavali - Nagmatha

1956 Sontha Ooru

1956 Raja Rani

1957 Alladdin Ka Chirag

1957 Allauddin Adhbhuta Deepam - Sitara, dancer

1957 Allavudeenum Arputha Vilakkum

1957 Sankalpam - Bhama

1957 Ambikapathy - Kannamma

1957 Sarangadhara

1957 Suvarna Sundari - Jayanthi

1957 Todi Kodallu - Navaneetham

1957 Vanangamudi - Ambige

1957 Pathini Deivam

1958 Sitaron Se Aage

1958 Anna Thammudu

1958 Thai Pirandhaal Vazhi Pirakkum

1958 Bhuloka Rambhai

1958 Manchi Manasuku Manchi Rojulu

1958 Mangalya Balam

1958 Pelli Naati Pramanalu - Radha Rani

1958 Kathavarayan - Kollimalai Kurathikalil Oruvar

1959 C.I.D. Girl

1959 Jayabheri - Narthaki Amrutha

1959 Raja Makutam - Prameela

1959 Sahodhari

1959 Thaai Magalukku Kattiya Thaali

1960s
1960 Aai Phirse Bahar

1960 Mahakavi Kalidasu

1960 Kavalai Illaadha Manithan

1960 Ponni Thirunaal

1960 Sangilithevan

1960 Shantinivasam

1961 Arasilangumari - Azhagurani

1961   Nallavan Vazhvan

1961 Velugu Needalu

1961 Iddaru Mitrulu - Sarala

1961 Sabash Raja

1962 Chitti Tammudu

1962 Khaidi Kannaiah

1962 Tiger Ramudu

1962 Padithal Mattum Podhuma

1963 Sri Tirupatamma Katha

1963 Valmiki

1963 Parisu

1963 Aapta Mitrulu

1964 Babruvahana - Uloochi

1965 Pandava Vanavasam - Dancer

1967 Konte Pilla

1967 En Thambi - (Dancer)

1968 Thirumal Perumai - (Dancer)

1970s
1972 Hantakulu Devantakulu

1972 Tata Manavadu - Geeta

1972 Jaga Mecchida Maga

1973 Bharatha Vilas as Sameera (Ibrahim's wife)

1973 Desoddharakulu

1973 Devudamma as Sheela

1974 Chakravakam

1974 Naan Avanillai

1974 Manushullo Devudu (1974 Telugu Film) Dancer

1974 Chakravakam

1975 Sila Nerangalil Sila Manithargal - Padma

1975  Idhayakani

1976  Thunive Thunai as the Head of Smugglers

1977 Palabishegham as Sengamalam

1977 Gaayathri

1978 Karunamayudu

1978 Shri Kanchi Kamakshi

1980s
1982 Ilanjodigal as Sivagami Nachiyar

1988 Kaliyuga Karnudu as Durgamma

1990s
1992 Chinna Kodalu as wife of Dr. Prabhakar Reddy

1995 Thodi Kodallu as mother of Jayasudha and Malasri

References

External links
 

1935 births
2013 deaths
Indian film actresses
Actresses in Malayalam cinema
Performers of Indian classical dance
Actresses in Tamil cinema
Actresses in Telugu cinema
Actresses in Kannada cinema
Deaths from kidney failure
Actresses from Vijayawada
20th-century Indian women artists
20th-century Indian actresses
20th-century Indian dancers
Dancers from Andhra Pradesh
Women artists from Andhra Pradesh